The 2016 UCI World Tour was a competition that included 27 road cycling events throughout the 2016 men's cycling season. It was the eighth edition of the ranking system launched by the Union Cycliste Internationale (UCI) in 2009. The competition started with the opening stage of the Tour Down Under on 19 January, and concluded with Il Lombardia on 1 October. Spain's Alejandro Valverde was the two-times defending champion.

Valverde was unable to defend his title, as he finished fourth in the individual rankings. The title was won for the first time by Slovakian rider Peter Sagan for the  team, scoring 669 points over the course of the season. This included victories at Gent–Wevelgem, the Tour of Flanders and the Grand Prix Cycliste de Québec. Second place went to Valverde's  team-mate Nairo Quintana, 60 points behind Sagan; Quintana also won three races overall: the Volta a Catalunya, the Tour de Romandie and the season's final Grand Tour, the Vuelta a España. Third place in the individual rankings went to Chris Froome, 45 points behind Quintana and 105 in arrears of Sagan. Froome took two wins on French soil during the World Tour campaign, winning the Critérium du Dauphiné as well as the Tour de France.

Two other sub-classifications were also contested. In the teams' rankings,  finished top for the fourth year running, with a total of 1471 points. The nations' rankings was headed by Spain, with a points advantage of 29 over Colombia, with Great Britain over 400 points adrift of Spain in third place.

Teams

Professional cycling teams were divided into several tiers: the top teams were UCI WorldTeams and were automatically entitled and obliged to enter all World Tour races. The organisers of each race were also permitted to invite other teams – generally UCI Professional Continental teams – to compete alongside the WorldTeams. The UCI selected the teams based on sporting, ethical, financial and administrative criteria. The number of WorldTeams was limited to 18. In October 2015, 17 teams were granted WorldTeam status by the UCI; these were the same teams that competed in the 2015 UCI World Tour. There were therefore a total of 18 teams selected for the 2016 World Tour.

As well as the addition of Team Dimension Data, there were two other changes to the team names for the 2016 season. The team that in 2015 had competed as  lost Saxo Bank as a sponsor and therefore became , while  became , although Garmin remained a sponsor of the team.  later became  and  became  as a result of mid-season sponsorship agreements.

Events
All events from the 2015 UCI World Tour were included, although some events were scheduled on different dates than previous editions. For the 2016 season UCI put forward a new ranking system to run alongside the normal WorldTour rankings. The new World Rankings ran over a 52-week period like the ATP and WTA rankings in tennis.

The team time trial at the UCI World Championships, scheduled to be held on 9 October, had been due to award points towards the team rankings. In August 2016, the Association International des Groupes Cyclistes Professionels (AIGCP) approved a motion for all UCI WorldTeams to boycott the time trial event, due to the UCI insisting that WorldTeams should compete in the event as a requirement of granting a WorldTeam licence without providing a participation allowance to teams, as is the case with other UCI World Tour races. It was reported that the UCI Professional Continental teams attending the AIGCP General Assembly also supported the motion. The UCI expressed disappointment with the move and stated that it "continued to expect excellent participation in this year's UCI Road World Championships Team Time Trial". However a month later, it was announced that WorldTeams would compete in the event, although not compulsory, and no points would be awarded towards the World Tour rankings.

Notes

Final points standings

Individual

Riders tied with the same number of points were classified by number of victories, then number of second places, third places, and so on, in World Tour events and stages.

 235 riders scored points. 34 other riders finished in positions that would have earned them points, but they were ineligible as they were not members of a WorldTeam.

Team

Team rankings were calculated by adding the ranking points of the top five riders of a team in the table.

Nation

National rankings were calculated by adding the ranking points of the top five riders registered in a nation in the table. The national rankings were also used to determine how many riders a country could have in the World Championships.

 Riders from 35 nations scored points.

Leader progress

References

External links

 
UCI World Tour
2016 in men's road cycling